Bradley Fold is a small district within the Metropolitan Borough of Bury, in Greater Manchester, England. It lies midway between Bolton and Bury, approximately 3 miles from each. It forms part of the Radcliffe North ward on Bury Council, and sits within the Bury South parliamentary constituency. Despite coming within Bury Council's governance, Bradley Fold residents have Bolton postal addresses and telephone numbers.

Bradley Fold has a trading estate, incorporating a council depot, and is also home to a former Dorma textiles factory. Since the mid-1990s, several new housing estates have been built. There are reservoirs open to anglers on Browns Road. In addition to a garden centre and social club, Bradley Fold has one pub, The Queens, where remnants of the former Bradley Fold railway station on the Liverpool and Bury Railway can be seen.

Villages in Greater Manchester
Geography of the Metropolitan Borough of Bury